Stephan de Jager is a South African rugby union plays for the  in the Currie Cup. His regular position is prop.

He joined the  ahead of the newly formed Super Rugby Unlocked competition in October 2020.

References

South African rugby union players
Living people
Rugby union props
Pumas (Currie Cup) players
Year of birth missing (living people)
Leopards (rugby union) players
Griffons (rugby union) players